Ceric ammonium nitrate (CAN) is the inorganic compound with the formula . This orange-red, water-soluble cerium salt is a specialised oxidizing agent in organic synthesis and a standard oxidant in quantitative analysis.

Preparation, properties, and structure
The anion  is generated by dissolving  in hot and concentrated nitric acid.

The salt consists of the hexanitratocerate(IV) anion  and a pair of ammonium cations . The ammonium ions are not involved in the oxidising reactions of this salt. In the anion each nitrate group chelates the cerium atom in a bidentate manner as shown below:

The anion  has Th (idealized Oh) molecular symmetry. The  core defines an icosahedron.

 is a strong one-electron oxidizing agent. Few shelf-stable reagents are stronger oxidants. In the redox process Ce(IV) is converted to Ce(III), a one-electron change, signaled by the fading of the solution color from orange to a pale yellow (providing that the substrate and product are not strongly colored).

Applications in organic chemistry
In organic synthesis, CAN is useful as an oxidant for many functional groups (alcohols, phenols, and ethers) as well as C–H bonds, especially those that are benzylic. Alkenes undergo dinitroxylation, although the outcome is solvent-dependent. Quinones are produced from catechols and hydroquinones and even nitroalkanes are oxidized.

CAN provides an alternative to the Nef reaction; for example, for ketomacrolide synthesis where complicating side reactions usually encountered using other reagents. Oxidative halogenation can be promoted by CAN as an in situ oxidant for benzylic bromination, and the iodination of ketones and uracil derivatives.

For the synthesis of heterocycles
Catalytic amounts of aqueous CAN allow the efficient synthesis of quinoxaline derivatives. Quinoxalines are known for their applications as dyes, organic semiconductors, and DNA cleaving agents. These derivatives are also components in antibiotics such as echinomycin and actinomycin. The CAN-catalyzed three-component reaction between anilines and alkyl vinyl ethers provides an efficient entry into 2-methyl-1,2,3,4-tetrahydroquinolines and the corresponding quinolines obtained by their aromatization.

As a deprotection reagent
CAN is traditionally used to release organic ligands from metal carbonyls. In the process, the metal is oxidised, CO is evolved, and the organic ligand is released for further manipulation. For example, with the Wulff–Dötz reaction an alkyne, carbon monoxide, and a chromium carbene are combined to form a chromium half-sandwich complex and the phenol ligand can be isolated by mild CAN oxidation.

CAN is used to cleave para-methoxybenzyl and 3,4-dimethoxybenzyl ethers, which are protecting groups for alcohols. Two equivalents of CAN are required for each equivalent of para-methoxybenzyl ether. The alcohol is released, and the para-methoxybenzyl ether converts to para-methoxybenzaldehyde. The balanced equation is as follows:

Other applications
CAN is also a component of chrome etchant, a material that is used in the production of photomasks and liquid crystal displays.

References

External links
 Oxidizing Agents: Cerium Ammonium Nitrate

Ammonium compounds
Cerium(IV) compounds
Nitrates
Coordination complexes
Oxidizing agents